Zvijezda (Serbian Cyrillic: Звијезда) is a mountain on the border of Serbia and Bosnia and Herzegovina, between towns of Bajina Bašta and Višegrad. Its highest peak Veliki Stolac lies on Bosnian territory and has an elevation of 1,673 meters above sea level, followed by Kozji rid (1591m), Pivnice (1575m), Mrka kosa (1545m), and Lisnata glavica (1510m), on Serbian side. Zvijezda lies in a large bend of the Drina river, and presents a western extension of the Tara mountain. Serbian parts of the mountain belong to the Tara National Park. 

A football club from neighbouring town of Višegrad bears its name, FK Zvijezda.

References

Mountains of Bosnia and Herzegovina
Mountains of Serbia